Michel Yves René Leray (2 June 1926 – 4 August 1985), better known by the stage name of Michel Jourdan, was French film actor.

Jourdan died in Paris on 4 August 1985, at the age of 59.

Selected filmography
 The Passenger (1949)
 Mammy (1951)
 They Were Five (1952)
 At the Edge of the City (1953)
 Burning Fuse (1957)
 The Cat (1958)
 The Cat Shows Her Claws (1960)

References

Bibliography 
 Goble, Alan. The Complete Index to Literary Sources in Film. Walter de Gruyter, 1999.

External links 
 

1926 births
1985 deaths
Actors from Nantes
French male film actors